Iskhak Razzakov (25 October 1910 – 18 March 1979) was a Kyrgyz politician who served as the first secretary of Communist Party of Kirghizia from 7 July 1950 to 9 May 1961.

Early life
Razzakov was born in Khorāsān on 25 October 1910. Razzakov lost his mother at the age of three, his father died two years later. His relatives sent him to a shelter where he was taught various languages. Razzakov studied in Uzbekistan and Russia.

He taught social studies at Samarkand, Uzbekistan. He was not an Uzbek, but a Kyrgyz.

Rise to politics and leading Kyrgyzstan
From 1945 to 1950, he was the Chairmen of the Council of People's Commissars (head of government) of the Kirghiz Soviet Socialist Republic. In 1950, he was appointed as the first secretary of the communist party of Kirghizia.

Razzakov played a significant role in shaping Kyrgyzstan. The current Kyrgyzstan state university, polytechnic institute, and women's pedagogical institute in Kyrgyzstan were built during his time in government. Kyrgyzstan went through major cultural improvements during his tenure. 20 important objects of national industry were put into operation during his time. The Frunze agricultural plant and the Osh mountain highway road were also built.

Later life and death

In the 1960s, he fell out of Khrushchev's favor and was persecuted. He moved to Moscow with his family and died on March 18 in 1979 in the city.

References

Second convocation members of the Supreme Soviet of the Soviet Union
Third convocation members of the Supreme Soviet of the Soviet Union
Fourth convocation members of the Supreme Soviet of the Soviet Union
Fifth convocation members of the Supreme Soviet of the Soviet Union
Recipients of the Order of the Red Star
Recipients of the Order of Lenin
People from Fergana Oblast
People from Fergana Region
1910 births
1979 deaths
Heads of government of the Kirghiz Soviet Socialist Republic
First secretaries of the Communist Party of Kirghizia